Franci Čop (17 November 1914 – 6 November 2003) was a Slovenian alpine skier. He competed at the 1936 Winter Olympics and the 1948 Winter Olympics, representing Yugoslavia.

References

1914 births
2003 deaths
Slovenian male alpine skiers
Olympic alpine skiers of Yugoslavia
Alpine skiers at the 1936 Winter Olympics
Alpine skiers at the 1948 Winter Olympics
Sportspeople from Jesenice, Jesenice